Casey J. Dailey (born June 11, 1975) is a former American football linebacker who played three seasons with the New York Jets of the National Football League (NFL). He was drafted by the Jets in the fifth round of the 1998 NFL Draft. He played college football at Northwestern University and attended Damien High School in La Verne, California. Dailey was also a member of the Chicago Enforcers of the XFL.

College career
Dailey was a three-year starter for the Northwestern Wildcats. He recorded 26 tackles for a loss and 12 sacks his senior year in 1997. He was named the Wildcats Defensive player of the year and earned first-team All-Big Ten honors as a senior. Dailey was also invited to East–West Shrine Game, Blue–Gray Football Classic and Hula Bowl in 1997. He accumulated 45 tackles and team high eight sacks his junior season. He returned a fumble 45 yards for a touchdown his sophomore year.

Professional career
Dailey was selected by the New York Jets of the NFL in the fifth round with the 134th pick in the 1998 NFL Draft. He signed with the Jets on July 8, 1998. He was released by the Jets on September 5 and signed to the team's practice squad on September 6, 1998. Dailey was activated from the practice squad on October 5, 1998. He played in six games for the Jets during the 1999 season. He was released by the Jets on August 20, 2000.

Dailey was a territorial selection of the Chicago Enforcers of the XFL in the XFL Draft and played for them in 2001.

References

External links
Just Sports Stats
College stats

Living people
1975 births
Players of American football from California
Sportspeople from Los Angeles County, California
American football linebackers
Northwestern Wildcats football players
New York Jets players
Chicago Enforcers players
People from Covina, California